The 1972 World Championship Tennis circuit was one of the two rival professional male tennis circuits of 1972. It was organized by World Championship Tennis (WCT). The circuit included twenty-three regular events, and two circuit finals, one taking place in May, counting for the second half of the 1971 season, and the first part of the 1972 season, and a smaller one taking place in November, counting for the second half of the 1972 season.

Schedule
This is the complete schedule of events on the 1972 WCT circuit, with player progression documented until the quarterfinals stage.

Key

February

March

April

May

July

August

September

October

November

Statistical information
These tables present the number of singles (S), and doubles (D) titles won by each player and each nation during the season, within all the tournament categories of the 1972 WCT circuit: the WCT Finals, and the regular series tournaments. The players/nations are sorted by: 1) total number of titles (a doubles title won by two players representing the same nation counts as only one win for the nation); 2) importance of those titles (a WCT Finals win equalling two regular tournaments wins); 3) a singles > doubles hierarchy; 4) alphabetical order (by family names for players).

Titles won by player

Titles won by nation

Standings
These are the standings of the top twenty singles players on the WCT circuit, at the end of the 1971 World Championship Tennis circuit, and after each edition of the WCT Finals in the 1972 season.

See also
1972 Grand Prix circuit
1972 USLTA Indoor Circuit
Association of Tennis Professionals
International Tennis Federation

References

External links
Association of Tennis Professionals (ATP) official website
International Tennis Federation (ITF) official website

 
World Championship Tennis circuit seasons
World Championship Tennis